Marcel Kimemba Mbayo (born 23 April 1978 in Lubumbashi) is a Congolese footballer who last played as a midfielder for A.F.C. Tubize.

He was part of the Congolese 2004 African Nations Cup team, who finished bottom of their group in the first round of competition, thus failing to secure qualification for the quarter-finals.

Career statistics

International goals 
Scores and results list DR Congo's goal tally first.

Honours 
 Gençlerbirliği
Turkish Cup (1): 2001

References

 Guardian Football

External links
 

1978 births
Living people
People from Lubumbashi
Democratic Republic of the Congo footballers
Democratic Republic of the Congo expatriate footballers
Democratic Republic of the Congo international footballers
1998 African Cup of Nations players
2002 African Cup of Nations players
2004 African Cup of Nations players
2006 Africa Cup of Nations players
Gençlerbirliği S.K. footballers
Sakaryaspor footballers
Malatyaspor footballers
K.S.C. Lokeren Oost-Vlaanderen players
A.F.C. Tubize players
Association football forwards
Süper Lig players
Belgian Pro League players
Expatriate footballers in Turkey
Expatriate footballers in Belgium
21st-century Democratic Republic of the Congo people